Patrick Collins (born 12 September 1996) is an Irish hurler who plays as a goalkeeper for club side Ballinhassig, university side Cork Institute of Technology and at inter-county level with the Cork senior hurling team.

Early life

Collins was born in Ballinhassig, County Cork. His father, Pat, was a goalkeeper for the Ballinhassig club, while his older Michael played for Cork minor, under-21 and intermediate and then his even older brother, Matthew, played for Cork in the minor, under-21 and intermediate grade too. His younger brother, Ger, has also played for Cork in the minor, under-21 and senior grades.

Playing career

College

Collins first came to prominence as a dual player with Coláiste an Spioraid Naoimh in Bishopstown, playing in both codes at every grade from under-14 to senior.

University

On 3 March 2016, Collins was in goal for the Cork Institute of Technology team that played Dublin City University in the All-Ireland Freshers Championship final. Collins was instrumental in pulling off a number of saves as CIT went on to win by 1-13 to 0-13.

Club

Collins joined the Ballinhassig club at a young age and played in all grades at juvenile and underage levels, enjoying championship success in the under-14 grade. He joined the club's top adult team in 2013.

Inter-county

Minor and under-21

Collins was just 15-years-old when he was added to the Cork minor panel shortly before the start of the 2012 Munster Minor Championship. On 2 May 2012, he made his first appearance for the team, lining out in goal in a 0-16 to 1-12 quarter-final defeat by Limerick. Collins spent three years with the minor team, however, Cork failed to make it beyond the provincial semi-final stage during that time.

Collins was in his second year with the minor team when he was also drafted onto the Cork under-21 team. He was just 16-years-old when he made his first appearance in that grade in a 15-point defeat by Tipperary in the Munster semi-final. In his second season with the team Collins lined out in his first Munster final, however, Cork lost out to Limerick by 1-28 to 1-13. His five year association with the under-21 team ended with a two-point defeat by Limerick in the 2017 Munster final.

Senior

Collins was just 18-years-old when he was drafted onto the Cork senior panel by team manager Jimmy Barry-Murphy in advance of the 2015 season. He was third-choice goalkeeper behind Anthony Nash and Darren McCarthy. Collins made his senior debut on 10 January 2015 in a preliminary round defeat of the University of Limerick in the pre-season Waterford Crystal Cup. He made his first start in a National League on 12 March 2016 in a one-point defeat by Kilkenny. On 9 July 2017, Collins won his first Munster medal as a non-playing substitute following a 1-25 to 1-20 defeat of Clare in the final.

On 1 July 2018, Collins won a second successive Munster medal as a non-playing substitute following a 2-24 to 3-19 defeat of Clare in the final.

Career statistics

Club

Inter-county

Honours

Cork Institute of Technology
 All-Ireland Freshers Hurling Championship (1): 2016

Cork
 Munster Senior Hurling Championship (2): 2017, 2018

References

External links

Patrick Collins profile at the Cork GAA website

1996 births
Living people
Ballinhassig hurlers
CIT hurlers
Cork inter-county hurlers
Hurling goalkeepers